Alfred Douglas (4 February 1872 – 9 June 1938) was an Australian cricketer. He played three first-class matches for Tasmania between 1893 and 1896.

See also
 List of Tasmanian representative cricketers

References

External links
 

1872 births
1938 deaths
Australian cricketers
Tasmania cricketers
Cricketers from Launceston, Tasmania